Swedish supergroup Glenmark Eriksson Strömstedt have released two studio albums and nine singles.

Albums

Studio albums

Singles

References 

Discographies of Swedish artists
Pop music group discographies
Rock music group discographies